The House of Lorraine originated as a cadet branch of the House of Metz. It inherited the Duchy of Lorraine in 1473 after the death without a male heir of Nicholas I, Duke of Lorraine. By the marriage of Francis of Lorraine to Maria Theresa of Austria in 1736, and with the success in the ensuing War of the Austrian Succession (1740–1748), the House of Lorraine was joined to the House of Habsburg and became known as the House of Habsburg‑Lorraine. Francis, his sons Joseph II and Leopold II, and his grandson Francis II were the last four Holy Roman emperors from 1745 until the dissolution of the empire in 1806. The House of Habsburg-Lorraine inherited the Habsburg Empire, ruling the Austrian Empire and then Austria-Hungary until the dissolution of the monarchy in 1918.

Although its senior agnates are the dukes of Hohenberg, the house is currently headed by Karl von Habsburg (born 1961), grandson of the last emperor Charles I.

Ancestry

A controversial origin 
The main two theories of the House's origin are:

 the theory of Etichonid ancestry, which claims that Adalbert of Metz and his brother Gerard were descendants of the Nordgau branch of the Etichonid Dynasty, the same branch from which the House of Habsburg and the House of Zähringen could possibly descend;
 the theory of Gerardide ancestry, which claims that Adalbert and Gerard descended from the Matfridings which are thought to have been a branch of the Gerardides.

The Etichonid origin was unanimously recognized from the 18th until the 20th century. For this reason, the marriage between Maria Theresa of Austria and Francis of Lorraine was seen at the time as the reunion of the two branches of the dynasty. The main proponents of this theory have been: Dom Calmet (1672 † 1757), Nicolas Viton de Saint-Allais (1773 † 1842) and more recently Michel Dugast Rouillé (1919 † 1987) and Henry Bogdan.

The main proponents of the Gerardide-Matfriding theory are: Eduard Hlawitschka, George Poull and partially the Europäische Stammtafeln (which however does not take into account the kinship with the Girardides).

The Renaissance dukes of Lorraine tended to arrogate to themselves claims to Carolingian ancestry, as illustrated by Alexandre Dumas, père in the novel La Dame de Monsoreau (1846); in fact, so little documentation survives on the early generations that the reconstruction of a family tree for progenitors of the House of Alsace involves a good deal of guesswork.

What is more securely demonstrated is that in 1048 Emperor Henry III gave the Duchy of Upper Lorraine first to Adalbert of Metz and then to his brother Gerard whose successors (collectively known as the House of Alsace or the House of Châtenois) retained the duchy until the death of Charles the Bold in 1431.

Houses of Vaudemont and Guise

After a brief interlude of 1453–1473, when the duchy passed in right of Charles's daughter to her husband John of Calabria, a Capetian, Lorraine reverted to the House of Vaudemont, a junior branch of House of Lorraine, in the person of René II who later added to his titles that of Duke of Bar.

The French Wars of Religion saw the rise of a junior branch of the Lorraine family, the House of Guise, which became a dominant force in French politics and, during the later years of Henri III's reign, was on the verge of succeeding to the throne of France. Mary of Guise, mother of Mary, Queen of Scots, also came from this family.

Under the Bourbon monarchy the remaining branch of the House of Guise, headed by the duc d'Elbeuf, remained part of the highest ranks of French aristocracy, while the senior branch of the House of Vaudemont continued to rule the independent duchies of Lorraine and Bar. Louis XIV's imperialist ambitions (which involved the occupation of Lorraine in 1669–97) forced the dukes into a permanent alliance with his archenemies, the Holy Roman Emperors from the House of Habsburg.

House of Habsburg‑Lorraine 

After Emperor Joseph I and Emperor Charles VI failed to produce a son and heir, the Pragmatic Sanction of 1713 left the throne to the latter's yet unborn daughter, Maria Theresa. In 1736 Emperor Charles arranged her marriage to Francis of Lorraine who agreed to exchange his hereditary lands for the Grand Duchy of Tuscany (as well as Duchy of Teschen from the Emperor).

At Charles's death in 1740 the Habsburg holdings passed to Maria Theresa and Francis, who was later elected (in 1745) Holy Roman Emperor as Francis I. The Habsburg-Lorraine nuptials and dynastic union precipitated, and survived, the War of the Austrian Succession. Francis and Maria Theresa's daughters Marie Antoinette and Maria Carolina became Queens of France and Naples-Sicily, respectively, while their sons Joseph II and Leopold II succeeded to the imperial title.

Apart from the core Habsburg dominions, including the triple crowns of Austria, Hungary and Bohemia, several junior branches of the House of Habsburg-Lorraine reigned in the Italian duchies of Tuscany (until 1860), Parma (until 1847) and Modena (until 1859). Another member of the house, Archduke Maximilian of Austria, was Emperor of Mexico (1863–67).

In 1900, Archduke Franz Ferdinand of Austria (then heir presumptive to the Austro-Hungarian throne) contracted a morganatic marriage with Countess Sophie Chotek. Their descendants, known as the House of Hohenberg, have been excluded from succession to the Austro-Hungarian crown, but not that of Lorraine, where morganatic marriage has never been outlawed. Nevertheless, Otto von Habsburg, the eldest grandson of Franz Ferdinand's younger brother, was universally regarded as the head of the house until his death in 2011. It was at Nancy, the former capital of the House of Vaudemont, that the former crown prince married Princess Regina of Saxe-Meiningen in 1951.

List of heads

The following is a list of ruling heads (after 1918 pretenders) of the house of Ardennes-Metz and its successor houses of Lorraine and Habsburg-Lorraine, from the start of securely documented genealogical history in the 11th century.

Gerhard III, Count of Metz, 990–1045
Adalbert, Duke of Upper Lorraine r. 1047/8
Gérard, Duke of Lorraine, r. 1048–1070
Theodoric (Thierry) II r. 1070–1115
Simon I, r. 1115–1138
Matthias I, r. 1138–1176
Simon II, r. 1176–1215
Frederick I, r. 1205/6
Frederick II, r. 1206–1213
Theobald I, r. 1213–1220
Matthias II, r. 1220–1251
Frederick III, c. 1251–1303
Theobald II, r. 1303–1312
Frederick IV, r. 1312–1328
Rudolph, r. 1328–1346 (killed in the Battle of Crécy)
John I, r. 1346–1390
Charles II, r. 1390–1431

Charles II died without male heir, the duchy passing to Isabella, Duchess of Lorraine, consort of Naples by marriage to Duke René of Anjou. The duchy passed to their son John II (r. 1453–1470), whose son Nicholas I (r. 1470–1473) died without heir. The title now went to Nicholas' aunt (sister of John II) Yolande.

House of Lorraine
The House of Lorraine was formed by Yolande's marriage to Frederick II, Count of Vaudémont (1428–1470), who was descended 
from John I (Yolande's great-grandfather) via his younger son Frederick I, Count of Vaudémont (1346–1390), Antoine, Count of Vaudémont (c. 1395–1431) and Frederick II, Count of Vaudémont (1417–1470). René inherited the title of Duke of Lorraine upon his marriage in 1473.

René II, Duke of Lorraine, r. 1473–1508
Antoine, r. 1508–1544
Francis I, r. 1544/5
Charles III, r. 1545–1608 (his mother Christina of Denmark served as his regent during his minority)
Henry II (I), r. 1608–1624 (leaving no sons, both of his daughters became Duchesses of Lorraine by marriage)
Nicole (m. Charles IV)
Claude (m. Nicholas II)
Francis II, (son of Charles III, duke for six days in 1625, abdicated in favour of his son) 
Charles IV, Duke of Lorraine r. 1624–1675 (briefly abdicated in favour of his brother in 1634)
Nicholas Francis (Nicholas II) (briefly made duke during the French invasion of Lorraine in 1634) 
Charles V, r. 1675–1690 (son of Nicholas Francis)
Leopold, r. 1690–1729
Francis (III) Stephen, Duke of Lorraine, r. 1728–1737, Holy Roman Emperor (as Francis I) r.  1745–1765

House of Habsburg–Lorraine
Joseph II, Holy Roman Emperor (1741–1790), r. 1765–1790
Leopold II, Holy Roman Emperor (1747–1792), r. 1790–1792
Francis II (IV) (1768–1835), Holy Roman Emperor 1792–1806, Emperor of Austria 1804–1835
Ferdinand I (V), Emperor of Austria (1793–1875), r. 1835–1848 (abdicated in 1848, succeeded by his nephew)
Franz Joseph I of Austria (1830–1916), r. 1848–1916, son of Archduke Franz Karl of Austria (1802–1878), a younger son of Francis II

The heir of Franz Joseph, Rudolf, Crown Prince of Austria, committed suicide in 1889. Franz Joseph was succeeded by his grandnephew, Charles I, son of Archduke Otto Francis, the son of Archduke Karl Ludwig, a younger brother of Franz Joseph.

Blessed Charles of Austria (Charles I and IV) (1887–1922), r. 1916–1919 (dissolution of the monarchy)
Otto von Habsburg (1912–2011)
Karl von Habsburg (b. 1961)
Heir apparent: Ferdinand Zvonimir von Habsburg (b. 1997)

Family tree

Notes and references

External links

|-

|-

|-

|-

|-

|-

|-

|-

|-

|-

 

de:Habsburg-Lothringen